Pokémon the Series: Sun & Moon – Ultra Adventures is the twenty-first season of the Pokémon anime series and the second season of Pokémon the Series: Sun & Moon, known in Japan as . This season takes place in the Alola region and follows the continuing adventures of Ash; his classmates Lillie, Lana, Mallow, Kiawe, and Sophocles; Ash's rival, Gladion; and antagonists James, Jessie and Meowth of Team Rocket  

The season originally aired in Japan from October 5, 2017, to October 14, 2018, on TV Tokyo, and in the United States from March 24, 2018, to February 23, 2019, on Disney XD. 

The ending songs are "Pose" (ポ-ズ, Pōzu),  by Taiiku Okazaki and the Japanese ending theme song of Pokémon the Movie: The Power of Us, "Breath" (ブレス, Buresu) by Porno Graffitti to promote the movie,. The English opening song is “Under the Alolan Moon” by composer Ed Goldfarb, featuring Haven Paschall and Ben Dixon. Its instrumental version serves as the ending theme.



Episode list

Home media releases 
Viz Media and Warner Home Video released the entire series on a single 5-disc boxset on DVD and Blu-ray in the United States on May 21, 2019. This is the first and so far, only complete Pokemon series to be released on the Blu-ray format in the United States, as the Indigo League boxset is missing the third volume.

Notes

References 

2017 Japanese television seasons
2018 Japanese television seasons
Season21